Tamnič is a village in the municipality of Negotin, Serbia. According to the 2002 census, the village has a population of 349 people.

References

Populated places in Bor District